Michael E. Jung is a Professor of Chemistry in the Department of Chemistry and Biochemistry at the University of California at Los Angeles.

Michael Jung was born May 14, 1947 in New Orleans, Louisiana.

Early life and education
Jung received a B.A. from Rice University in Houston, Texas in 1969 and a Ph.D. from Columbia University in New York City in 1973 where he did research with Gilbert Stork.

Career

Jung then obtained a NATO Postdoctoral Fellowship to work with Albert Eschenmoser at the Eidgenössische Technische Hochschule in Zürich, Switzerland. In 1974, he joined the faculty at UCLA, where he has spent his career. In 1979 Jung was awarded a Sloan research fellowship.

Jung's research is focused on the development of new reactions for organic synthesis, including the Jung "non-aldol aldol" protocol, an alternate method for obtaining aldol products without using the classical aldol reaction.  He has also developed chemical syntheses for a variety of natural products with antitumor and antiviral properties including tedanolides, oxetanocin, halomons, and xestobergsterol. Other research interests include the bridged Robinson annulation and the mixed Lewis acid Diels-Alder process.

Jung's research group developed an antagonist of the androgen receptor enzalutamide, which is a pharmaceutical drug used for the treatment of hormone refractory prostate cancer. An analog of enzalutamide, apalutamide, was also FDA approved.

Awards
 2022 IUPAC-Richter Prize
 2016 Glenn T. Seaborg Medal, UCLA
 2016 Richard C. Tolman Award, Southern California Section of the American Chemical Society
 2015 American Association for Cancer Research AACR Awards Team Science Award
 1995 American Chemical Society Arthur C. Cope Scholar Award

References

University of California, Los Angeles faculty
21st-century American chemists
Living people
Rice University alumni
Columbia University alumni
1947 births